Paolo Cavallone (born in Sulmona in 1975) is an Italian composer, pianist, and poet.

Biography

Paolo Cavallone graduated in Piano (Master - 1999), Composition (Master - 2001), and Orchestration for Band (Master - 1999) at the State Conservatory "Casella" of L'Aquila (Italy). Cavallone was then awarded a place at the Accademia Chigiana in Siena and at the Accademia Nazionale di Santa Cecilia in Rome where, from 2002 to 2004, he studied Composition under Azio Corghi. Cavallone received also a Laurea Magistrale in Modern Literature (2001) from the Università degli Studi dell'Aquila and a Ph.D. (2009) from the State University of New York (USA).

Cavallone’s compositions, published by Rai Com, have been broadcast by Radio Rai, Radio New Zealand, Radio Capodistria, University Radio UFRGS (Brazil), and other radio stations.
Cavallone’s works have been released on CDs by Albany Records, Tactus, GuitArt, Domani Musica, and Suono Sonda.  Among the commissions received: Siemens Foundation (2011), Dilijan Music Series of Los Angeles (2006), Società Barattelli of L’Aquila (2007).

In 2013-14, Paolo Cavallone has been Professor of Composition at the State Conservatory “Respighi” of Latina (Italy) and, in 2010, at the New Zealand School of Music (Victoria University of Wellington). In 2009-10, he was appointed Research Collaborator at the State University of New York (USA).

Cavallone has given guest lectures at the Manhattan School of Music (USA), University of Pittsburgh, McMaster University in Hamilton (Canada), Conservatorio di Santa Cecilia of Rome, and other institutes. His works have been a subject of seminars in Universities and conferences in Italy and abroad.

In 2005, he became a member of Nuova Consonanza.

Discography
 Hóros, monographic CD, Tactus (TC.970304), Italy, 2017 performers: Stroma ensemble, Quartetto Guadagnini, Rohan De Saram, Magnus Andersson, Pascal Gallois.
 Confini, CD monografico e DVD , Tactus (TC.970302), Italy, 2012 performers: Roberto Fabbriciani, Magnus Andersson, Jean Kopperud, Stephen Gosling, Lorna Windsor, Luca Sanzò, James Avery, Movses Pogossian, Tony Arnold.
 Contrasto, monographic CD, Domani Musica (DMCD0301), Italy, 2002
 1900-2000, CD compilation: Au réveil il était midi (b), guitar Antonio d’Augello, GuitArt 042012, Magazine n. 67, Italy, July 2012
 Extreme Measures, CD compilation: (Dis)tensioni for clarinet and piano. Albany Records (TROY 1217-18), USA, 2010
 web & hubs, CD compilation: En coup de foudre for violin and piano Suono Sonda, n.7, Italy, 2009
 La Piega, Il Taglio, CD compilation: Contrasto, string quartet Suono Sonda, n.2, Italy, 2004

Bibliography
 Dagnino E., ‘’La percezione, l’invisibile’’ (analytical article). In : Suono Sonda, n.7, Genova, Italy, 2009 pp. 64-68
 Domenici C. L.,” O Pianista Expandido: Complexidade Técnica e Estilística na obra Confini de Paolo Cavallone” . in : Congresso da Associaçao Nacional de pesquisa e pós graduação em Música, 21. Uberlândia (Brasil), UFU: 2011, p. 1197-1203
 Domenici, C. L., “Beyond notation. The Oral memory of Confini". In : Performa, encontros de investigaçao em performance, 5, 2011, Aveiro. University of Aveiro (Portugal), pp. 1–14
 Domenici, C. L., ‘’Three instances of composer-performer collaboration : the performer’s point of view’’. In: Second Meeting of the European Platform for Artistic Research in Music, Rome, Italy, 2012 pp.20-22
 Frengel M., The unorthodox guitar, Oxford University Press, New York, USA, 2017 (p. 97 Example: Au réveil il était midi)
 Mastropietro A., ‘’In-side Out... il suono’’ (analytical article) In: Suono Sonda, n.2, Genova, Italy, 2004 pp. 40-44
 Nardacci, F., ‘’Riflessi e dinamiche della contemporaneità nella musica. Intervista a Paolo Cavallone’’ . In AA. VV. Universi Sonori, Nuove Tendenze Edizioni, Lucca, Italie, 2015 A collection of interviews to contemporary composers (Paolo Cavallone, Ennio Morricone, Giorgio Gaslini)
 Ranalli A., ‘’Frammenti Lirici sulle note di Paolo Cavallone’’. In : Rondò, n.3. 2008 pp. 10-13
 Tarquinio G., Dal ‘’cilindro’’ di Tosti. Discografia generale dei compositori abruzzesi. Documenti di storia musicale abruzzese, 4, Libreria Musicale Italiana (LIM), Lucca, Italy, 2008 p. 59 (dettagli sul CD Contrasto)
 Documentary. Titolo : Ritratto di un compositore, Paolo Cavallone. Video 26 minutes. Director Tulliani D., RAI Trade, Italia, 2009 (publisher : Tactus, TC.970302, 2012)
 Interview/documentary on satellite channel Sky 835, AB Channel (interview with Tiziana Le Donne – episode dedicated to Paolo Cavallone). 15 Minuti (Pescara) October 13, 2015

Notes

Italian composers
1975 births
Living people
People from Sulmona
University of L'Aquila alumni